Hesperisternia karinae is a species of sea snail, a marine gastropod mollusk in the family Pisaniidae.

Description

Distribution

References

 Watters G.T. & Fraussen K. (2015). A revision of the western Atlantic Ocean genus Engina with notes on Hesperisternia (Gastropoda: Buccinidae: Pisaniinae). The Nautilus. 129(3): 95-117
 Daccarett, E. Y. & Bossio, V. S. 2011. Colombian Seashells from the Caribbean Sea. L'Informatore Piceno. 384pp.
 Turgeon, D.; Quinn, J.F.; Bogan, A.E.; Coan, E.V.; Hochberg, F.G.; Lyons, W.G.; Mikkelsen, P.M.; Neves, R.J.; Roper, C.F.E.; Rosenberg, G.; Roth, B.; Scheltema, A.; Thompson, F.G.; Vecchione, M.; Williams, J.D. (1998). Common and scientific names of aquatic invertebrates from the United States and Canada: mollusks. 2nd ed. American Fisheries Society Special Publication, 26. American Fisheries Society: Bethesda, MD (USA). . IX, 526 + cd-rom pp.

External links
 Rosenberg, G.; Moretzsohn, F.; García, E. F. (2009). Gastropoda (Mollusca) of the Gulf of Mexico, pp. 579–699 in: Felder, D.L. and D.K. Camp (eds.), Gulf of Mexico–Origins, Waters, and Biota. Texas A&M Press, College Station, Texas

Pisaniidae
Gastropods described in 1959